Tennessee Volunteers tennis may refer to one of the following tennis teams at the University of Tennessee:
 Tennessee Volunteers men's tennis, the men's tennis team
 Tennessee Volunteers women's tennis, the women's tennis team